Olivia Barash (born January 11, 1965) is an American actress. She began her career as a child actor, appearing in television series such as Little House on the Prairie, Charlie's Angels, and Soap. She subsequently had a lead role on the short-lived sitcom In the Beginning, which originally aired in 1978. She also had a lead role in the Walt Disney television film Child of Glass (1978). As a young adult, Barash established herself in supporting film roles in Repo Man (1984), Tuff Turf (1985), Patty Hearst (1988), and Floundering (1994).

Biography

Early life and performances
Barash was born January 11, 1965, in Miami, Florida. Barash was raised in New York City, and began acting professionally at age 11. During her early years of acting, singing and dancing in classic musicals on stage in New York, she starred as "Baby June" in Gypsy with Angela Lansbury. She was the first child actress to win the New York Critic's Circle Award. Moving to Hollywood as a teen with her family, she attended Palisades High School in Pacific Palisades, California, and graduated in 1982.

Barash appeared in the pilot episode of The Incredible Hulk, aping the famous "flower girl" scene from James Whale's Frankenstein. In this version, she befriends the Hulk, but their friendship is cut short by her hunter father, who shoots the Hulk with a rifle, causing the Hulk to hurl him hundreds of feet into a nearby lake. Barash also appeared as a guest in two episodes of Mary Hartman, Mary Hartman in 1977, and in 1978, was cast in a main role on the sitcom In the Beginning, which followed a conservative Catholic priest and liberal, socially-conscious nun who run a mission in Baltimore; the series ran only five episodes on CBS, though a total of nine were filmed before the series was canceled. The same year, she starred in the Walt Disney television film Child of Glass, in which she portrayed the ghost of a young girl murdered during the Antebellum era.

Later career
In 1984, Barash appeared in Repo Man, in which she had a supporting role playing a UFO cultist. The following year, she appeared opposite Robert Downey, Jr., James Spader and Kim Richards in the teen drama Tuff Turf (1985). In 1987, Barash had a main supporting role in the television series Fame, playing Maxie Sharp. In 1988, she had a supporting role in Paul Schrader's biopic Patty Hearst.

In 1990, Oliver Stone wrote Barash into The Doors portraying a folksinger on the Sunset Strip, performing her original song, Who's Walking Away published by It's True You Boys Music (BMI). 

Barash went on to sign to Warner Chappell Music as a songwriter/artist in 1992. Her focus shifted to recording and playing her music through the nineties and into this century.

Filmography

Film

Television

References

External links

 
 
 
 
 

American film actresses
American child actresses
American musical theatre actresses
American stage actresses
American television actresses
Actresses from Miami
Actresses from New York City
1965 births
Living people
20th-century American actresses
21st-century American actresses